Sutton F.C. can refer to several English non-league football teams:

Bishop Sutton A.F.C.
Long Sutton Athletic F.C.
Mole Valley Sutton Common Rovers F.C.
Sutton Athletic F.C.
Sutton Coldfield Town F.C.
Sutton Town A.F.C.
Sutton United F.C.